Maik Petzold (born January 16, 1978) is an athlete from Germany who competes in triathlons.

Petzold competed in triathlon at the 2004 Summer Olympics.  He placed nineteenth with a total time of 1:54:52.90.  He also competed in the triathlon at the 2012 Summer Olympics.  This time he finished in 31st place.

References

German male triathletes
Triathletes at the 2004 Summer Olympics
Triathletes at the 2012 Summer Olympics
1978 births
Living people
Olympic triathletes of Germany
20th-century German people
21st-century German people